The Embassy of New Zealand in Berlin is the diplomatic representation of New Zealand in the Federal Republic of Germany. The building in which the embassy is located on the fourth floor can be found at Friedrichstrasse 60 (the name of the building is "Atrium") on the corner of Leipziger Strasse. The current ambassador is Craig Hawke.

The embassy offers consular services for New Zealanders in Germany, Switzerland, Liechtenstein and the Czech Republic and is also the contact point for citizens from these countries in embassy matters.

References

Berlin
Germany–New Zealand relations
Mitte
New Zealand